Knockmany passage tomb, or Anya's Cove, is an ancient burial monument on the summit of Knockmany Hill, near the village of Augher in County Tyrone, Northern Ireland. It is the remains of a Neolithic passage tomb and its stones are decorated with rare megalithic art. They are protected by a concrete chamber and mound, built in 1959 by the Department of the Environment, roughly resembling the mound that would have originally covered it. The stones can be viewed through the entrance gates. It is a monument in state care.

Description
The monument is a passage tomb built during the Neolithic, about 3000 BC. The chamber was originally covered with a stone cairn and earth. The orthostats remain: these are of height , and three of them show carved decorations including concentric circles, spirals and zigzags. They are similar to the decorated stones of the tombs at Loughcrew and Newgrange.

Legends
Knockmany comes . Báine (meaning "whiteness") was a supernatural being, probably a goddess, who became conflated with the more famous goddess Áine. According to legend, Queen Báine was wife of the 1st-century King Túathal Techtmar and was buried here, in the tomb of the earlier Queen Áine.

In Irish folklore, the location was the home of Fionn mac Cumhaill (Finn McCool) and his wife Oonagh.

See also
 Irish megalithic tombs
 List of megalithic monuments in Ireland

References

Archaeological sites in County Tyrone
Megalithic monuments in Northern Ireland
Tombs in the United Kingdom